The National Unity Party (UBP) is a national-conservative political party in Northern Cyprus. It was founded by Rauf Denktaş on 11 October 1975. The party was in power from its creation until the 2003 elections with the exception of the period from 1994–1996.

In the 2009 legislative elections for the House of Representatives of Northern Cyprus the party won 44% of the popular vote and 26 out of 50 seats, forming a majority government. Its candidate, former Prime Minister Derviş Eroğlu amassed at the Northern Cyprus presidential elections (of 17 April 2005) 22.8% of the votes.

From 2016 until elections in early 2018, the party was the senior partner in a minority government with the Democratic Party, with its leader Hüseyin Özgürgün serving as Prime Minister. It had previously been a junior partner in a coalition with the Republican Turkish Party, preceded by a period as the opposition party between 2013 and 2015.

Election results

Leaders of the National Unity Party
 Rauf Denktaş (11 October 1975 – 3 July 1976)
 Nejat Konuk (3 July 1976 – 2 March 1978)
 Osman Örek (18 April 1978 – 7 January 1979)
 Mustafa Çağatay (7 January 1979 – 30 November 1983)
 Derviş Eroğlu (18 December 1983 – 11 February 2006)
 Hüseyin Özgürgün (11 February 2006 – 16 December 2006)
 Tahsin Ertuğruloğlu (16 December 2006 – 29 November 2008)
 Derviş Eroğlu (29 November 2008 – 23 April 2010)
 İrsen Küçük (9 May 2010 – 11 June 2013)
 Hüseyin Özgürgün (31 August 2013 – 30 October 2018)
 Ersin Tatar (30 October 2018 – 23 October 2020)
 Ersan Saner (20 December 2020 – 31 October 2021)
  Faiz Sucuoğlu (31 October 2021 – 1 January 2023)
 Ünal Üstel (1 January 2023 - present)

References

External links
Official website

Political parties in Northern Cyprus
Conservative parties in Europe
Conservative parties in Asia
National conservative parties
Right-wing parties
Turkish nationalism in Cyprus
1975 establishments in Northern Cyprus
Political parties established in 1975
Turkish nationalist organizations